Ironi Nesher is an Israeli football club based in Nesher. They are currently in Liga Alef and play home matches at the Nesher Stadium.

History
The club was founded in 2009 as a successor to Hapoel Tel Hanan, which was founded in 1954 and dissolved in 2009. Hapoel Tel Hanan was based in the Tel Hanan neighborhood of Nesher, and spent three seasons in the second tier of Israeli football, first in the 1975–76 season, where they were placed 14th in Liga Alef North division, and later in the new second tier at the time, Liga Artzit, where they were placed 13th in the 1981–82 season, and finished bottom in the following season and relegated to Liga Alef. their last season as Hapoel Tel Hanan was 2008–09, in the Samaria division of Liga Gimel, the lowest tier of Israeli football, where they finished in the eighth place.

The new club, Ironi Nesher, started the following season at the same division in Liga Gimel. Although they finished in the third place, they were eventually promoted to Liga Bet North B division, after one spot was vacated in this league, as Maccabi Beit She'an dissolved.

In the 2013–14 season, the club won Liga Bet North B division, and was promoted to Liga Alef.

In the 2014–15 season, the club finished runners-up in Liga Alef North division, and qualified for the Promotion play-offs. After beating Hapoel Migdal HaEmek 4–3 on penalties (after 2–2) in the first round and Hapoel Beit She'an 2–1 in the second round, Ironi Nesher won 1–0 against the Liga Alef South play-off winner, Beitar Kfar Saba,  and stood 180 minutes away from promotion to Liga Leumit, when they faced the 14th placed in 2014–15 Liga Leumit, Hapoel Nazareth Illit. Ironi Nesher lost 1–5 on aggregate (0–5, 1–0) and remained in Liga Alef.

In the 2015–16 season, the club won Liga Alef North division and promoted to Liga Leumit.

Current squad
 As to 10 February 2022

Honours

League

1Achieved by Hapoel Tel Hanan.

External links
Ironi Nesher The Israel Football Association

References

Nesher
Association football clubs established in 2009
2009 establishments in Israel